Battle Hymn may refer to:

 Battle Hymn (film) (1957), directed by Douglas Sirk
 Battle Hymn (comics), by B. Clay Moore and Jeremy Haun
 "Battle Hymn" (Manowar song) (1982), from Manowar's album Battle Hymns
 "The Battle Hymn of the Republic" (1861), popularized during the American Civil War
 "The Battle Hymn of the Reformation" (1527–1529), by Martin Luther
 "Battle Hymn of the Tiger Mother" by Amy Chua

Battle Hymns may refer to:

 Battle Hymns (Manowar album) (1982)
 Battle Hymns (Suicide Machines album) (1998)